Neophytus II was Patriarch of Constantinople twice, in 1602–03 and in 1607–12.

An Athenian, he served as Metropolitan of Athens from 1597 until 3 April 1602, when he was elected as Patriarch in the place of his rival, Matthew II. His tenure was cut short a year later, when he was deposed amid accusations of various scandals. He was initially exiled to Rhodes, and thence to Saint Catherine's Monastery in the Sinai.

He was restored to the patriarchal throne on 15 October 1607, and held it for five years. During his second tenure he took care of aligning church administrative practice and canon law with the contemporary needs, and took measures to replenish the patriarchal coffers. He was also in contact with Western potentates, including Pope Paul V and King Philip III of Spain, whom he urged to engage in a crusade to liberate the Orthodox Christians from the Ottoman Empire, going as far as to make considerable concessions to the doctrine of the Catholic Church, including recognizing papal primacy. His pro-Western policy and financial exactions made him many enemies, including Cyril Lucaris, who succeeded in securing his deposition in October 1612. Originally slated to be exiled to Rhodes again, he was protected by his successor, Timothy II, who had been his protégé.

References

16th-century births
17th-century deaths
16th-century Eastern Orthodox bishops
16th-century Greek clergy
17th-century Ecumenical Patriarchs of Constantinople
17th-century Greek clergy
Bishops of Athens
Greeks from the Ottoman Empire
Clergy from Athens